Turridrupa is a genus of sea snails, marine gastropod mollusks in the family Turridae, the turrids.

Description
(Original description) The solid shell has a cylindro-fusiform. Its colour is usually monochrome, sometimes brown orange or yellow. The protoconch consists of two smooth turbinate whorls, followed by a whorl ornamented with close arcuate riblets. The adult sculpture consists of numerous revolving keels, one or more of which may break up into bead rows. The fasciole (= spiral band on  the edgse of a canal formed by successive growth lines) is indefinite. The siphonal notch has a short subcircular incision with a raised margin. The aperture shows revolving ridges on the palate.

Distribution
This marine species occurs in the Indo-Pacific and off Australia.

Species
Species within the genus Turridrupa include:
 Turridrupa acutigemmata (E.A. Smith, 1877)
 †Turridrupa akhaiderensis Abbass H., 1977 
 Turridrupa albofasciata (Smith E. A., 1877)
 Turridrupa albogemmata Stahlschmidt & Fraussen, 2011
 Turridrupa armillata (Reeve, 1845)
 Turridrupa astricta (Reeve, 1843)
 Turridrupa bijubata (Reeve, 1843)
 Turridrupa cincta (Lamarck, 1822)
 Turridrupa consobrina Powell, 1967
 Turridrupa deceptrix Hedley, 1922
 Turridrupa diffusa Powell, 1967
 Turridrupa elongata Watkins, 2010 
 Turridrupa erythraea (Weinkauff, 1875)
 Turridrupa gatchensis (Hervier, 1896)
 Turridrupa jubata (Reeve, 1843)
 Turridrupa nagasakiensis (Smith E. A., 1879)
 Turridrupa poppei Stahlschmidt & Fraussen, 2011
 Turridrupa prestoni Powell, 1967
 Turridrupa weaveri Powell, 1967
Species brought into synonymy
 Turridrupa barkliensis H. Adams, 1869: synonym of Drillia barkliensis (H. Adams, 1869) 
 Turridrupa cerithina (Anton, 1838): synonym of Crassispira cerithina (Anton, 1838)
 Turridrupa fastosa (Hedley, 1907): synonym of Microdrillia fastosa (Hedley, 1907)
  † Turridrupa kagoshimaensis Shuto, 1965: synonym of  † Otitoma kagoshimaensis (Shuto, 1965) (original combination)
 † Turridrupa mangaoparia Beu, 1970: synonym of † Drilliola mangaoparia  (Beu, 1970) 
 † Turridrupa maoria Powell, 1942 : synonym of † Drilliola maoria (Powell, 1942) 
 Turridrupa pertinax Hedley, 1922: synonym of Microdrillia pertinax (Hedley, 1922) (original combination)

References

 Powell, A.W.B. 1966. The molluscan families Speightiidae and Turridae, an evaluation of the valid taxa, both Recent and fossil, with list of characteristic species. Bulletin of the Auckland Institute and Museum. Auckland, New Zealand 5: 1–184, pls 1–23 
  Kilburn R.N. (1988). Turridae (Mollusca: Gastropoda) of southern Africa and Mozambique. Part 4. Subfamilies Drillinae, Crassispirinae and Strictispirinae. Annals of the Natal Museum. 29(1): 167-320.
 Wilson, B. 1994. Australian marine shells. Prosobranch gastropods. Kallaroo, WA : Odyssey Publishing Vol. 2 370 pp.

External links
 Bouchet, P.; Kantor, Y. I.; Sysoev, A.; Puillandre, N. (2011). A new operational classification of the Conoidea (Gastropoda). Journal of Molluscan Studies. 77(3): 273-308
  Tucker, J.K. 2004 Catalog of recent and fossil turrids (Mollusca: Gastropoda). Zootaxa 682:1-1295.

 
Turridae